László "Les" Bélády (born April 29, 1928, in Budapest; died November 6, 2021) was a Hungarian computer scientist notable for devising the Bélády's Min theoretical memory caching algorithm in 1966 while working at IBM Research. He also demonstrated the existence of a Bélády's anomaly. During the 1980s, he was the editor-in-chief of the IEEE Transactions on Software Engineering.

Education
Bélády earned B.S. in Mechanical Engineering, then an M.S. in Aeronautical Engineering at the Technical University of Budapest in 1950.

Life and career
He left Hungary after the Hungarian Revolution of 1956. Then he worked as a draftsman at Ford Motor Company in Cologne and as an aerodynamics engineer at Dassault in Paris. In 1961, he immigrated to the United States. In the 1960s and 1970s, he primarily lived in New York City with stints in California and England, where he joined International Business Machines and did early work in operating systems, virtual machine architectures, program behavior modeling, memory management, computer graphics, Asian character sets, and data security.

From 1961 – 1981, he worked at IBM Corp. at the Thomas J. Watson Research Center, where he worked as program manager for software technology. In his later years at IBM, he was responsible for software engineering worldwide until leaving for Tokyo to create its software research lab. In 1981, he worked as manager of software engineering at Japan Science Institute for two years. In 1984, he joined the Microelectronics and Computer Technology Corporation in Austin and founded its Software Technology Program. He focused the program on creating advanced technology for aiding the distributed design of large complex software systems. From 1991 to 1998, he served as president and CEO of Mitsubishi Electric Research Laboratories, Inc. (MERL). He has been in various University advisory roles including a member of the computer science advisory board at the University of Colorado at Boulder and foreign member of the Hungarian Academy of Sciences. In his retirement he spent much of his time in Budapest and Austin.

Attainment
Bélády is known for the "Belady Algorithm", the OPT (or MIN) Page Replacement Algorithm.
He co-designed and built IBM M44/44X, an experimental machine which is the first computer with multiple virtual machine organization. He is co-founder of an industrial research consortium, the MCC. Bélády also participated in the design of the earliest commercial time-sharing systems, the TSS-67.

Awards
 1969 & 1973: IBM Outstanding Contribution Awards
 1988: IEEE "for contributions to the design of large software systems"
 1990: J. D. Warnier Prize for Excellence in Information

Publications
 Belady, Laszlo A., "A Study of Replacement Algorithms for a Virtual Storage Computer," IBM Systems Journal, Vol. 5, No. 2 June 1966, pp. 78–10.
 Belady, Laszlo A., and Meir L. Lehman, Program Evolution, Processes of Software Change, Academic Press, London, 1985.

References

1928 births
2021 deaths
Hungarian computer scientists
Computer systems researchers
American software engineers
Businesspeople in software
Hungarian chief executives
IBM employees
Mitsubishi Electric people
University of Colorado Boulder faculty
Budapest University of Technology and Economics alumni
Hungarian emigrants to the United States
Hungarian expatriates in Germany
Hungarian expatriates in France
Scientists from Budapest